Milorad Popović Šapčanin (7 July 1841 — 28 February 1895) was a Serbian poet, writer, dramatist, pedagogue and educational reformer who exemplified Realism in his approach. He was also artistic director of the National Theatre in Belgrade (1877 and 1880-1893), a member of the Serbian Learned Society and Serbian Royal Academy.

Selected works
Pesme, Štamparija Nikole Stefanovića, Belgrade, 1863.
Pesme, Državna štamparija, Belgrade, 1866.
Pripovetke, Štamparija braće Jovanovića, Pančevo, 1877.
Hasan-aga, Izdanje knjižare Velimira Valožića, Belgrade, 1879.
Pripovetke, Pančevo, 1879.
S Drine na Nišavu, Državna štamparija, Belgrade, 1879.
Nevesta Ljutice Bogdana, Belgrade, 1880.
Žubori i vihori, Kraljevsko-srpska državna štamparija, Belgrade, 1883.
Miloš u Latinima, slika u jednom činu, izdanje Srpske knjižare i Štamparije braće M. Popovića, Novi Sad, 1886.
Monah, Srpska štamparijadr Svetozara Miletića, Novi Sad, 1887.
Pripovetke, Štamparija Srpske knjižare braće M. Popovića, Novi Sad, 1887.
Sanjalo, Izdanje Srpske knjižare i štamparije braće M. Popovića, Novi Sad, 1888.
Zadužbina, Izdanje i štampa A. Pajevića, Novi Sad, 1893.
Poslednje pripovetke, Štamparsko-umetnički zavod Pehera i Kisića, Mostar, 1902.
Celokupna dela Milorada P. Šapčanina I-V, Narodna prosveta, Belgrade, 1932.

References

Sources
 Jovan Skerlić: Istorija nove srpske književnosti (Belgrade, 1921), pages 334-338

External links 
 
 Biography on the website of SANU

Writers from Šabac
1841 births
1895 deaths
Members of the Serbian Academy of Sciences and Arts